The following is an incomplete list of association football clubs based in Zimbabwe.
For a complete list see :Category:Football clubs in Zimbabwe

List of Zimbabwean football clubs

1 
 12la United

A 
Air Zimbabwe     
Amazulu FC

B 
Bantu Rovers (Bulawayo)
Batanai 
Bindura United 
Blackpool 
Black Aces 
Black Mambas (Harare)
Black Rhinos F.C.
Blue Swallows     
Border Strikers
Brian Ken 
Buffaloes Matare
Buymore (CAPS FC)

C 
CAPS United (Harare)
Chapungu F.C. 
Chapungu United F.C. 
Chegutu Pirates
Chicken Inn F.C.
Chrome Stars
Circle United
Cottco (Kadoma)
Corrugated 
Cranbonne Bullets

D 
Darryn T 
Dongo Sawmills
Douglas Warriors (Harare)
DT Africa United
Dynamos (Harare)

E 
Eagles (Chitungwiza)
Eastern Lions 
Eiffel Flats
Elvington

F 
FC Victoria (Masvingo)
Fire Batteries

G 
Gunners F.C. (Harare)
Guni United

H 
Hackney
Harare City F.C.
Hardbody FC
Herentals F.C. (Harare)
Highlanders (Bulawayo)
How Mine FC
Hwange (Hwange)

I 
 Intundla

J 
 Jena Mine
 Jets

K 
Kambuzuma United (Harare) 
Kango 
Kiglon F.C. (Chitungwiza)
Kadoma Stars Football Club

L 
Lancashire Steel F.C.
Lengthens (Kuwadzana, Harare)
Lulu Rovers

M 
 Mandava United 
Manica Diamonds F.C.
Masvingo United F.C. 
Mhangura 
Midlands Cables
Mkwasine          
Monomotapa United (Harare)
Motor Action (Harare)
 Morris F.C (Harare)
Mushowani Stars F.C.
Mwana Africa F.C. (Bindura)

N
Njube Sundowns F.C.
Ngezi Platinum F.C.

O 
 Olivine

R 
Railstars (Bulawayo) 
Red Seal
Rufaro Rovers

S 
Savanna 
Shabanie F.C.
Shabanie Mine (Zvishavane)
Shangani 
Shushine 
Sporting Lions
Sundowns

T 
Triangle United
Triple B FC
Tanganda 
Thorngrove 
Tongogara     
Trojan

U 
Underhill F.C.
 Unicem

Z 
Zambezi River Authority 
 Zimall
Zimbabwe Saints F.C.
Zisco Steel 
ZRP Tomlinson
ZPC Kariba

Defunct football clubs of Rhodesia

A 
 Alexandra (Bulawayo)
 Arcadia United

B 
 Beira 
 Black Rhinos (Mutare)  
 British South African Police (Bulawayo) 
 Bulawayo Athletic Club 
 Bulawayo Rovers

C 
 Castle Lions 
 Chibuku F.C. (Salisbury) 
 Chibuku Shumba   
 Civil Service (Umtali) 
 Crusaders (Umtali)

D 
 DMB Tigers (Bulawayo)

F 
 Forresters (Umtali)

G 
 Gweru United

K 
 Karls United 
 Kings (Bulawayo) 
 Kopje (Bulawayo)

L 
 Lusitanos

M 

 Mangula 
 Meikles 
 Metal Box

N 
 Nchanga Sports

P 
 Poastal (Bulawayo) 
 Police (Bulawayo)  
 ProNutto

Q 
 Queens (Bulawayo)

R 
 Railway (Bulawayo) 
 Ramblers (Umtali) 
 Raylton (Bulawayo) 
 Rusape United (Rusape)

S 
 Saint Paul 
 Salisbury Callies (Bulawayo) 
 Salisbury City Wanderers 
 Salisbury Tornados
 Salisbury United (Bulawayo)

T 
 Terriers (Bulawayo)
 Triple B FC

U 
 Umtali FC (Umtali)

Z 
 Zimbabwe Saints (Bulawayo)  
 ZiscoSteel (Redcliff)

Notes 

 
Zimbabwe
Football
Football clubs